St. Paul Methodist Episcopal Church, also known as St. Paul United Methodist Church, is a historic Methodist Episcopal church located at Rushville, Rush County, Indiana.  It was built in 1887, and is a one-story, cruciform plan, Victorian Gothic style brick building with a steeply pitched gable roof. A basement was added in 1923. It features a square bell tower, Gothic arched windows, decorative stone bands, and terra cotta accents.

It was listed on the National Register of Historic Places in 1997.

References

External links
church website

Methodist churches in Indiana
Churches on the National Register of Historic Places in Indiana
Victorian architecture in Indiana
Gothic Revival architecture in Indiana
Churches completed in 1887
Buildings and structures in Rush County, Indiana
National Register of Historic Places in Rush County, Indiana